David Štípek (born 31 May 1992) is a Czech professional footballer who plays for TJ Přeštice as a midfielder.

Career
After a spell at German club SV Poppenreuth, Štípek returned to the Czech Republic in February 2021, signing with TJ Přeštice.

Career statistics 
As of 20 February 2013

References

External links
Profile at fcviktoria.cz

1992 births
Living people
Czech footballers
Czech expatriate footballers
Association football forwards
Czech Republic youth international footballers
Czech Republic under-21 international footballers
Association football midfielders
FC Viktoria Plzeň players
FK Mladá Boleslav players
FC Hradec Králové players
1. FK Příbram players
FC Fastav Zlín players
FK Viktoria Žižkov players
FK Baník Sokolov players
Czech First League players
Czech National Football League players
Czech expatriate sportspeople in Germany
Expatriate footballers in Germany
People from Nýřany
Sportspeople from the Plzeň Region